Nikolay  Gavrilovich Smorchkov (August 9, 1930 – March 7, 2021) was a Soviet and Russian film actor.

Biography 
Nikolay Smorchkov was born on August 9, 1930, in the village of Ivankovo, Gavrilovo-Posadsky District, in a large peasant family named Gavril Ivanovich and Pelageya Matveyevna. In 1933, fleeing Collectivization, the family moved to the village of Orgtrud, which was not far from Vladimir (now the district of the city). Being still in the 7th grade, the future actor caught a movie and decided to become a film actor.

After graduation Smorchkov came to Moscow and entered the VGIK (course of Sergei Gerasimov and Tamara Makarova), where he had to deal specially with removing his pronounced accent. While still in his second year in 1951, he played his first role in Gerasimov's film The Village Doctor. He graduated from VGIK in 1953 with a red diploma. After graduating from the institute, the actor was enrolled in the theater-studio of the film actor and the film studio Mosfilm, where he worked for almost forty years. On the stage of the theater he played in the play  The Evening of Old Vaudevilles, went with him on tour, but then completely switched to cinema.

He starred in more than 160 films.

Smorchkov died on March 7, 2021, from COVID-19 amid the COVID-19 pandemic in Russia. He was 90.

Selected filmography 
  The Village Doctor (1951) as  Zhenya Strukov
  Mysterious Discovery  (1953) as sailor
  True Friends  (1954) as Alexey Mazayev
  The Cranes Are Flying  (1957) as patient in hospital
 Ballad of a Soldier (1959) as soldier
 Female Age-Mates (1959) as Anikin
 Five Days, Five Nights (1960) as soldier
 Ivan's Childhood (1962) as petty officer
 War and Peace (1965—1967) as Russian soldier
 The Secret Agent's Blunder (1968) as freak
 The Red Tent (1969) as sailor
 Gentlemen of Fortune (1971) as police officer
 Liberation (1971) as captain Neustroyev's orderly
 Incorrigible Liar (1973) as MFA employee
 Earthly Love (1974) as builder
 Jarosław Dąbrowski (1976) as non-commissioned officer
 The Days of the Turbins (1976) as First Officer
 Destiny (1977) as partisan
 Air Crew (1979) as airport guard
 Fox Hunting (1980) as militiaman
 Tree Dzhamal (1981) as Gromov
 A Cruel Romance (1984) as Priest
 Alone and Unarmed (1984) as Treshchalov
 Promised Heaven (1991) as Timofeich
 The Thief (1997) as janitor
 Tycoon (2002) as Old man
 Tins (2007) as veteran
 Space Dogs (2010) as Professor (voice)

References

External links

 Николай Гаврилович Сморчков (биография). Авторский сайт Алексея Тремасова.
Николай Сморчков. Русский характер

1930 births
2021 deaths
Soviet male film actors
People from Ivanovo Oblast
Russian male film actors
Russian male television actors
Russian male voice actors
Gerasimov Institute of Cinematography alumni
Deaths from the COVID-19 pandemic in Russia
20th-century Russian male actors
21st-century Russian male actors